Blitzer may refer to:

People
Barry Blitzer (1929–2010), American television writer
Wolf Blitzer (born 1948), American journalist 
David Blitzer (disambiguation)

Other uses
 blitzer (gridiron football), a player performing the blitz (gridiron football)
 Blitzers, a South Korean boy band

See also

 
 Harris Blitzer Sports & Entertainment, U.S. company
 Blitzerman, a fictional character from Disney's The Incredibles
 Blitzar, a kind of pulsar that will become a black hole if it stops spinning
 Blitz (disambiguation)